The Motherwell by-election was held on 12 April 1945, following the death of Labour Party Member of Parliament (MP) for Motherwell, James Walker.

The by-election took place during the Second World War during unusual political conditions.  No general election had been held since 1935, at which James Walker narrowly gained the seat for Labour from the Unionist Party.

There was a truce between the major parties: Labour, the Conservative Party, Liberal Party and the National Liberal Party.  The Communist Party of Great Britain, which had held Motherwell in the past, also undertook to abide by the truce.  As a result, the only opposition in by-elections came from independents, minor parties and occasional unofficial party candidates aligned with major parties.

For the by-election, the Labour Party stood Alexander Anderson.  His only opposition came from the Scottish National Party (SNP), then a small party advocating Scottish independence, who stood Party Secretary Robert McIntyre.

Results
The election was won by McIntyre, who became the first SNP Member of Parliament.  However, Anderson regained the seat from McIntyre at the 1945 general election a few months later.

See also
List of United Kingdom by-elections (1931–1950)

References
Dick Douglas, At the Helm: The Life & Times of Dr. Robert D McIntyre

Motherwell by-election
By-elections to the Parliament of the United Kingdom in Scottish constituencies
Motherwell by-election
Motherwell by-election, 1945
Motherwell by-election, 1945
Motherwell
Politics of North Lanarkshire